

Events

Pre-1600
 962 – Emperor Otto I and Pope John XII co-sign the Diploma Ottonianum, recognizing John as ruler of Rome.
1322 – The central tower of Ely Cathedral falls on the night of 12th–13th.
1462 – The Treaty of Westminster is finalised between Edward IV of England and the Scottish Lord of the Isles.
1503 – Challenge of Barletta: Tournament between 13 Italian and 13 French knights near Barletta.
1542 – Catherine Howard, the fifth wife of Henry VIII of England, is executed for adultery.

1601–1900
1633 – Galileo Galilei arrives in Rome for his trial before the Inquisition.
1642 – The Clergy Act becomes law, excluding bishops of the Church of England from serving in the House of Lords.
1660 – With the accession of young Charles XI of Sweden, his regents begin negotiations to end the Second Northern War.
1689 – William and Mary are proclaimed co-rulers of England.
1692 – Massacre of Glencoe: Almost 80 Macdonalds at Glen Coe, Scotland are killed early in the morning for not promptly pledging allegiance to the new king, William of Orange.
1726 – Parliament of Negrete between Mapuche and Spanish authorities in Chile bring an end to the Mapuche uprising of 1723–26. 
1755 – Treaty of Giyanti signed by VOC, Pakubuwono III and Prince Mangkubumi. The treaty divides the Javanese kingdom of Mataram into two: Sunanate of Surakarta and Sultanate of Yogyakarta.
1849 – The delegation headed by Metropolitan bishop Andrei Șaguna hands out to the Emperor Franz Joseph I of Austria the General Petition of Romanian leaders in Transylvania, Banat and Bukovina, which demands that the Romanian nation be recognized.
1861 – Italian unification: The Siege of Gaeta ends with the capitulation of the defending fortress, effectively bringing an end of the Kingdom of the Two Sicilies.
1867 – Work begins on the covering of the Senne, burying Brussels's primary river and creating the modern central boulevards.
1880 – Thomas Edison observes Thermionic emission.

1901–present
1913 – The 13th Dalai Lama proclaims Tibetan independence following a period of domination by Manchu Qing dynasty and initiated a period of almost four decades of independence.
1914 – Copyright: In New York City the American Society of Composers, Authors and Publishers is established to protect the copyrighted musical compositions of its members.
1920 – The Negro National League is formed.
1931 – The British Raj completes its transfer from Calcutta to New Delhi.
1935 – A jury in Flemington, New Jersey finds Bruno Hauptmann guilty of the 1932 kidnapping and murder of the Lindbergh baby, the son of Charles Lindbergh.
1945 – World War II: The siege of Budapest concludes with the unconditional surrender of German and Hungarian forces to the Red Army.
  1945   – World War II: Royal Air Force bombers are dispatched to Dresden, Germany to attack the city with a massive aerial bombardment.
1951 – Korean War: Battle of Chipyong-ni, which represented the "high-water mark" of the Chinese incursion into South Korea, commences.
1954 – Frank Selvy becomes the only NCAA Division I basketball player ever to score 100 points in a single game.
1955 – Israel obtains four of the seven Dead Sea Scrolls.
  1955   – Twenty-nine people are killed when Sabena Flight 503 crashes into Monte Terminillo near Rieti, Italy.
1960 – With the success of a nuclear test codenamed "Gerboise Bleue", France becomes the fourth country to possess nuclear weapons.
  1960   – Black college students stage the first of the Nashville sit-ins at three lunch counters in Nashville, Tennessee.
1961 – An allegedly 500,000-year-old rock is discovered near Olancha, California, US, that appears to anachronistically encase a spark plug.
1967 – American researchers discover the Madrid Codices by Leonardo da Vinci in the National Library of Spain.
1975 – Fire at One World Trade Center (North Tower) of the World Trade Center in New York.
1978 – Hilton bombing: A bomb explodes in a refuse truck outside the Hilton Hotel in Sydney, Australia, killing two refuse collectors and a policeman.
1981 – A series of sewer explosions destroys more than two miles of streets in Louisville, Kentucky.
1983 – A cinema fire in Turin, Italy, kills 64 people.
1984 – Konstantin Chernenko succeeds the late Yuri Andropov as general secretary of the Communist Party of the Soviet Union.
1990 – German reunification: An agreement is reached on a two-stage plan to reunite Germany.
1991 – Gulf War: Two laser-guided "smart bombs" destroy the Amiriyah shelter in Baghdad. Allied forces said the bunker was being used as a military communications outpost, but over 400 Iraqi civilians inside were killed.
1996 – The Nepalese Civil War is initiated in the Kingdom of Nepal by the Communist Party of Nepal (Maoist-Centre).
2001 – An earthquake measuring 7.6 on the Richter magnitude scale hits El Salvador, killing at least 944.
2004 – The Harvard–Smithsonian Center for Astrophysics announces the discovery of the universe's largest known diamond, white dwarf star BPM 37093. Astronomers named this star "Lucy" after The Beatles' song "Lucy in the Sky with Diamonds".
2007 – Taiwan opposition leader Ma Ying-jeou resigns as the chairman of the Kuomintang party after being indicted on charges of embezzlement during his tenure as the mayor of Taipei; Ma also announces his candidacy for the 2008 presidential election.
2008 – Australian Prime Minister Kevin Rudd makes a historic apology to the Indigenous Australians and the Stolen Generations.
2010 – A bomb explodes in the city of Pune, Maharashtra, India, killing 17 and injuring 60 more.
2011 – For the first time in more than 100 years the Umatilla, an American Indian tribe, are able to hunt and harvest a bison just outside Yellowstone National Park, restoring a centuries-old tradition guaranteed by a treaty signed in 1855.
2012 – The European Space Agency (ESA) conducted the first launch of the European Vega rocket from Europe's spaceport in Kourou, French Guiana.
2017 – Kim Jong-nam, brother of North Korean dictator Kim Jong-un, is assassinated at Kuala Lumpur International Airport.
2021 – Former U.S. President Donald Trump is acquitted in his second impeachment trial.
  2021   – A major winter storm causes blackouts and kills at least 82 people in Texas and northern Mexico.

Births

Pre-1600
1440 – Hartmann Schedel, German physician (d. 1514)
1457 – Mary of Burgundy, Sovereign Duchess regnant of Burgundy, married to Maximilian I, Holy Roman Emperor (d. 1482)
1469 – Elia Levita, Renaissance Hebrew grammarian (d. 1549)
1480 – Girolamo Aleandro, Italian cardinal (d. 1542)
1523 – Valentin Naboth, German astronomer and mathematician (d. 1593)
1539 – Elisabeth of Hesse, Electress Palatine (d. 1582)
1569 – Johann Reinhard I, Count of Hanau-Lichtenberg (d. 1625)
1599 – Pope Alexander VII (d. 1667)

1601–1900
1602 – William V, Landgrave of Hesse-Kassel (d. 1637)
1672 – Étienne François Geoffroy, French physician and chemist (d. 1731)
1683 – Giovanni Battista Piazzetta, Italian painter (d. 1754)
1719 – George Brydges Rodney, 1st Baron Rodney, English admiral and politician (d. 1792)
1721 – John Reid, Scottish general (d. 1807)
1728 – John Hunter, Scottish surgeon and anatomist (d. 1793)
1766 – Thomas Robert Malthus, English economist and scholar (d. 1834)
1768 – Édouard Adolphe Casimir Joseph Mortier, French general and politician, 15th Prime Minister of France (d. 1835)
1769 – Ivan Krylov, Russian author, poet, and playwright (d. 1844)
1805 – Peter Gustav Lejeune Dirichlet, German mathematician and academic (d. 1859)
1811 – François Achille Bazaine, French general (d. 1888) 
1815 – Rufus Wilmot Griswold, American anthologist, editor, poet and critic (d. 1857)
1831 – John Aaron Rawlins, American general and politician, 29th United States Secretary of War (d. 1869)
1834 – Heinrich Caro, Sephardic Jewish Polish-German chemist and academic (d. 1910)
1835 – Mirza Ghulam Ahmad, Indian religious leader (d. 1908)
1849 – Lord Randolph Churchill, English lawyer and politician, Chancellor of the Exchequer (d. 1895)
1855 – Paul Deschanel, Belgian-French politician, 11th President of France (d. 1922)
1863 – Hugo Becker, German cellist and composer (d. 1941)
1867 – Harold Mahony, Scottish-Irish tennis player (d. 1905)
1870 – Leopold Godowsky, Polish-American pianist and composer (d. 1938)
1873 – Feodor Chaliapin, Russian opera singer (d. 1938)
1876 – Fritz Buelow, German-American baseball player and umpire (d. 1933)
1879 – Sarojini Naidu, Indian poet and activist (d. 1949)
1880 – Dimitrie Gusti, Romanian sociologist, ethnologist, historian, and philosopher (d. 1955)
1881 – Eleanor Farjeon, English author, poet, and playwright (d. 1965)
1883 – Hal Chase, American baseball player and manager (d. 1947)
  1883   – Yevgeny Vakhtangov, Russian-Armenian actor and director (d. 1922)
1884 – Alfred Carlton Gilbert, American pole vaulter and businessman, founded the A. C. Gilbert Company (d. 1961)
1885 – Bess Truman, 35th First Lady of the United States (d. 1982)
1887 – Géza Csáth, Hungarian playwright and critic (d. 1919)
1888 – Georgios Papandreou, Greek lawyer, economist, and politician, 162nd Prime Minister of Greece (d. 1968)
1889 – Leontine Sagan, Austrian actress and director (d. 1974)
1891 – Kate Roberts, Welsh author and activist (d. 1985)
  1891   – Grant Wood, American painter and academic (d. 1942)
1892 – Robert H. Jackson, American lawyer, judge, and politician, 57th United States Attorney General (d. 1954)
1898 – Hubert Ashton, English cricketer and politician (d. 1979)
1900 – Barbara von Annenkoff, Russian-born German film and stage actress (d. 1979)

1901–present
1901 – Paul Lazarsfeld, Austrian-American sociologist and academic (d. 1976)
1902 – Harold Lasswell, American political scientist and theorist (d. 1978)
1903 – Georgy Beriev, Georgian-Russian engineer, founded the Beriev Aircraft Company (d. 1979)
  1903   – Georges Simenon, Belgian-Swiss author (d. 1989)
1906 – Agostinho da Silva, Portuguese philosopher and author (d. 1994)
1907 – Katy de la Cruz, Filipino-American singer and actress (d. 2004)
1910 – William Shockley, English-American physicist and academic, Nobel Prize laureate (d. 1989)
1911 – Faiz Ahmad Faiz, Indian-Pakistani poet and journalist (d. 1984)
  1911   – Jean Muir, American actress and educator (d. 1996)
1912 – Harald Riipalu, Russian-Estonian commander (d. 1961) 
  1912   – Margaretta Scott, English actress (d. 2005)
1913 – Khalid of Saudi Arabia (d. 1982)
1915 – Lyle Bettger, American actor (d. 2003)
  1915   – Aung San, Burmese general and politician, 5th Premier of British Crown Colony of Burma (d. 1947)
1916 – Dorothy Bliss, American invertebrate zoologist (d. 1987)
1919 – Tennessee Ernie Ford, American singer and actor (d. 1991)
  1919   – Eddie Robinson, American football player and coach (d. 2007)
1920 – Boudleaux Bryant, American songwriter (d. 1987)
  1920   – Eileen Farrell, American soprano and educator (d. 2002)
1921 – Jeanne Demessieux, French pianist and composer (d. 1968)
  1921   – Aung Khin, Burmese painter (d. 1996)
1922 – Francis Pym, Baron Pym, Welsh soldier and politician, Secretary of State for Foreign and Commonwealth Affairs (d. 2008)
  1922   – Gordon Tullock, American economist and academic (d. 2014)
1923 – Michael Anthony Bilandic, American soldier, judge, and politician, 49th Mayor of Chicago (d. 2002)
  1923   – Chuck Yeager, American general and pilot; first test pilot to break the sound barrier (d. 2020)
1924 – Jean-Jacques Servan-Schreiber, French journalist and politician (d. 2006)
1926 – Fay Ajzenberg-Selove, American nuclear physicist  (d. 2012)   
1928 – Gerald Regan, Canadian lawyer and politician, 19th Premier of Nova Scotia (d. 2019)
1929 – Omar Torrijos, Panamanian commander and politician, Military Leader of Panama (d. 1981)
1930 – Ernst Fuchs, Austrian painter, sculptor, and illustrator (d. 2015)
  1930   – Israel Kirzner, English-American economist, author, and academic
1932 – Susan Oliver, American actress (d. 1990)
1933 – Paul Biya, Cameroon politician, 2nd President of Cameroon
  1933   – Kim Novak, American actress 
  1933   – Emanuel Ungaro, French fashion designer (d. 2019)
1934 – George Segal, American actor (d. 2021) 
1937 – Ali El-Maak, Sudanese author and academic (d. 1992)
  1937   – Sigmund Jähn, German pilot and cosmonaut (d. 2019)
  1937   – Angelo Mosca, American-Canadian football player and wrestler
1938 – Oliver Reed, English actor (d. 1999)
1940 – Bram Peper, Dutch sociologist and politician, Mayor of Rotterdam
1941 – Sigmar Polke, German painter and photographer (d. 2010)
  1941   – Bo Svenson, Swedish-American actor, director, and producer
1942 – Carol Lynley, American model and actress (d. 2019)
  1942   – Peter Tork, American singer-songwriter, bass player, and actor (d. 2019)
  1942   – Donald E. Williams, American captain, pilot, and astronaut (d. 2016)
1943 – Elaine Pagels, American theologian and academic
1944 – Stockard Channing, American actress 
  1944   – Jerry Springer, English-American television host, actor, and politician, 56th Mayor of Cincinnati
1945 – Marian Dawkins, English biologist and academic
  1945   – King Floyd, American singer-songwriter (d. 2006)
  1945   – Simon Schama, English historian and author
  1945   – William Sleator, American author and composer (d. 2011)
1946 – Richard Blumenthal, American sergeant and politician, 23rd Attorney General of Connecticut
  1946   – Janet Finch, English sociologist and academic
  1946   – Colin Matthews, English composer and educator
1947 – Stephen Hadley, American soldier and diplomat, 21st United States National Security Advisor
  1947   – Mike Krzyzewski, American basketball player and coach
  1947   – Bogdan Tanjević, Montenegrin-Bosnian professional basketball coach
  1947   – Kevin Bloody Wilson, Australian comedian, singer-songwriter, and guitarist
1949 – Peter Kern, Austrian actor, director, producer, and screenwriter (d. 2015)
1950 – Vera Baird, English lawyer and politician
  1950   – Peter Gabriel, English singer-songwriter and musician
1952 – Ed Gagliardi, American bass player (d. 2014)
1953 – Akio Sato, Japanese wrestler and manager
1954 – Donnie Moore, American baseball player (d. 1989)
1955 – Joe Birkett, American lawyer, judge, and politician
1956 – Peter Hook, English singer, songwriter, bass player, multi-instrumentalist, and record producer
1957 – Denise Austin, American fitness trainer and author
1958 – Pernilla August, Swedish actress
  1958   – Marc Emery, Canadian publisher and activist
  1958   – Jean-François Lisée, Canadian journalist and politician
  1958   – Derek Riggs, English painter and illustrator
  1958   – Øivind Elgenes, Norwegian vocalist, guitarist, and composer
1959 – Gaston Gingras, Canadian ice hockey player
1960 – Pierluigi Collina, Italian footballer and referee
  1960   – John Healey, English journalist and politician
  1960   – Gary Patterson, American football player and coach
  1960   – Artur Yusupov, Russian-German chess player and author
1961 – Marc Crawford, Canadian ice hockey player and coach
  1961   – cEvin Key, Canadian singer-songwriter, drummer, keyboard player, and producer 
  1961   – Henry Rollins, American singer-songwriter, producer, and actor
1962 – Aníbal Acevedo Vilá, Puerto Rican lawyer and politician
  1962   – Baby Doll, American wrestler and manager
  1962   – Michele Greene, American actress
1964 – Stephen Bowen, American engineer, captain, and astronaut
  1964   – Ylva Johansson, Swedish educator and politician, Swedish Minister of Employment
1965 – Peter O'Neill, Papua New Guinean accountant and politician, 7th Prime Minister of Papua New Guinea
1966 – Neal McDonough, American actor and producer
  1966   – Jeff Waters, Canadian guitarist, songwriter, and producer 
  1966   – Freedom Williams, American rapper and singer
1967 – Stanimir Stoilov, Bulgarian footballer and coach
1968 – Kelly Hu, American actress
1969 – Joyce DiDonato, American soprano and actress
  1969   – Bryan Thomas Schmidt, American science fiction author and editor
1970 – Karoline Krüger, Norwegian singer-songwriter and pianist
1971 – Sonia Evans, English singer-songwriter
  1971   – Mats Sundin, Swedish ice hockey player
  1971   – Todd Williams, American baseball player
1972 – Virgilijus Alekna, Lithuanian discus thrower
  1972   – Charlie Garner, American football player
1974 – Fonzworth Bentley, American rapper and actor
  1974   – Robbie Williams, English singer-songwriter 
1975 – Ben Collins, English race car driver
  1975   – Katie Hopkins, English media personality and columnist
1976 – Jörg Bergmeister, German race car driver
  1976   – Shannon Nevin, Australian rugby league player
1977 – Randy Moss, American football player and coach
1978 – Niklas Bäckström, Finnish ice hockey player
  1978   – Philippe Jaroussky, French countertenor
1979 – Anders Behring Breivik, Norwegian murderer
  1979   – Rafael Márquez, Mexican footballer
  1979   – Rachel Reeves, English economist and politician, Shadow Secretary of State for Work and Pensions
  1979   – Mena Suvari, American actress and fashion designer
1980 – Carlos Cotto, Puerto Rican-American wrestler and boxer
1981 – Luisão, Brazilian footballer 
1982 – Even Helte Hermansen, Norwegian guitarist and composer 
  1982   – Michael Turner, American football player
1983 – Mike Nickeas, Canadian baseball player
  1983   – Anna Watkins, English rower
1984 – Hinkelien Schreuder, Dutch swimmer
1985 – Somdev Devvarman, Indian tennis player
  1985   – Kwak Ji-min, South Korean actress
1986 – Luke Moore, English footballer
  1986   – Aqib Talib, American football player
1987 – Eljero Elia, Dutch footballer
1988 – Ryan Goins, American baseball player
  1988   – Eddy Pettybourne, New Zealand-Samoan rugby league player
1989 – Rodrigo Possebon, Brazilian footballer
1991 – Eliaquim Mangala, French footballer
  1991   – Junior Roqica, Australian-Fijian rugby league player
  1991   – Vianney, French singer
1994 – Memphis Depay, Dutch footballer
2001 – Kaapo Kakko, Finnish ice hockey player

Deaths

Pre-1600
106 – Emperor He of Han (Han Hedi) of the Chinese Eastern Han Dynasty (b. AD 79)
 721 – Chilperic II, Frankish king (b. 672)
 858 – Kenneth MacAlpin, Scottish king (probable; b. 810)
 921 – Vratislaus I, duke of Bohemia
 936 – Xiao Wen, empress of the Liao Dynasty 
 942 – Muhammad ibn Ra'iq, Abbasid emir and regent
 988 – Adalbert Atto, Lombard nobleman
1021 – Al-Hakim bi-Amr Allah, Fatimid caliph (b. 985)
1130 – Honorius II, pope of the Catholic Church (b. 1060)
1141 – Béla II, king of Hungary and Croatia (b. 1110)
1199 – Stefan Nemanja, Serbian grand prince (b. 1113)
1219 – Minamoto no Sanetomo, Japanese shōgun (b. 1192)
1332 – Andronikos II Palaiologos, Byzantine emperor (b. 1259)
1351 – Kō no Morofuyu, Japanese general
1539 – Isabella d'Este, Italian noblewoman (b. 1474)
1542 – Catherine Howard, English wife of Henry VIII of England (executed; b. 1521)
1571 – Benvenuto Cellini, Italian painter and sculptor (b. 1500)
1585 – Alfonso Salmeron, Spanish priest and scholar (b. 1515)

1601–1900
1602 – Alexander Nowell, English clergyman and theologian (b. 1507)
1660 – Charles X Gustav, king of Sweden (b. 1622)
1662 – Elizabeth Stuart, queen of Bohemia (b. 1596)
1693 – Johann Caspar Kerll, German organist and composer (b. 1627)
1727 – William Wotton, English linguist and scholar (b. 1666)
1728 – Cotton Mather, American minister and author (b. 1663)
1732 – Charles-René d'Hozier, French historian and author (b. 1640)
1741 – Johann Joseph Fux, Austrian composer and theorist (b. 1660)
1787 – Roger Joseph Boscovich, Croatian physicist, astronomer, mathematician, and philosopher (b. 1711)
  1787   – Charles Gravier, comte de Vergennes, French lawyer and politician, Foreign Minister of France (b. 1717)
1813 – Samuel Ashe, American lawyer and politician, 9th Governor of North Carolina (b. 1725)
1818 – George Rogers Clark, American general (b. 1752)
1826 – Peter Ludwig von der Pahlen, Russian general and politician, Governor-General of Baltic provinces (b. 1745)
1831 – Edward Berry, English admiral (b. 1768) 
1837 – Mariano José de Larra, Spanish journalist and author (b. 1809)
1845 – Henrik Steffens, Norwegian-German philosopher and poet (b. 1773)
1859 – Eliza Acton, English food writer and poet (b. 1799)
1877 – Costache Caragiale, Romanian actor and manager (b. 1815)
1883 – Richard Wagner, German composer (b. 1813)
1888 – Jean-Baptiste Lamy, French-American archbishop (b. 1814)
1892 – Provo Wallis, Canadian-English admiral (b. 1791)
1893 – Ignacio Manuel Altamirano, Mexican intellectual and journalist (b. 1834)

1901–present
1905 – Konstantin Savitsky, Russian painter (b. 1844)
1906 – Albert Gottschalk, Danish painter (b. 1866)
1934 – József Pusztai, Slovene-Hungarian poet and journalist (b. 1864)
1942 – Otakar Batlička, Czech journalist (b. 1895)
  1942   – Epitácio Pessoa, Brazilian lawyer, judge, and politician, 11th President of Brazil (b. 1865)
1950 – Rafael Sabatini, Italian-English novelist and short story writer (b. 1875)
1951 – Lloyd C. Douglas, American minister and author (b. 1877)
1952 – Josephine Tey, Scottish author and playwright (b. 1896)
1954 – Agnes Macphail, Canadian educator and politician (b. 1890)
1956 – Jan Łukasiewicz, Polish mathematician and philosopher (b. 1878)
1958 – Christabel Pankhurst, English activist, co-founded the Women's Social and Political Union (b. 1880)
  1958   – Georges Rouault, French painter and illustrator (b. 1871)
1964 – Paulino Alcántara, Filipino-Spanish footballer and manager (b. 1896)
  1964   – Werner Heyde, German psychiatrist and academic (b. 1902)
1967 – Yoshisuke Aikawa, entrepreneur, businessman, and politician, founded Nissan Motor Company (b. 1880)
  1967   – Abelardo L. Rodríguez, substitute president of Mexico (1932-1934) (b. 1889)
1968 – Mae Marsh, American actress (b. 1895)
  1968   – Portia White, Canadian opera singer (b. 1911)
1973 – Marinus Jan Granpré Molière, Dutch architect and educator (b. 1883)
1975 – André Beaufre, French general (b. 1902)
1976 – Murtala Mohammed, Nigerian general and politician, 4th President of Nigeria (b. 1938)
  1976   – Lily Pons, French-American soprano and actress (b. 1904)
1980 – David Janssen, American actor (b. 1931)
1984 – Cheong Eak Chong, Singaporean entrepreneur (b. 1888)
1986 – Yuri Ivask, Russian-American poet and critic (b. 1907)
1989 – Wayne Hays, American lieutenant and politician (b. 1911)
1991 – Arno Breker, German sculptor and illustrator (b. 1900)
1992 – Nikolay Bogolyubov, Ukrainian-Russian mathematician and physicist (b. 1909)
1996 – Martin Balsam, American actor (b. 1919)
1997 – Robert Klark Graham, American eugenicist and businessman (b. 1906)
  1997   – Mark Krasnosel'skii, Russian-Ukrainian mathematician and academic (b. 1920)
2000 – Anders Aalborg, Canadian educator and politician (b. 1914)
  2000   – James Cooke Brown, American sociologist and author (b. 1921)
  2000   – John Leake, English soldier (b. 1949)
2002 – Waylon Jennings, American singer-songwriter and guitarist (b. 1937)
2003 – Kid Gavilán, Cuban-American boxer (b. 1926)
  2003   – Walt Whitman Rostow, American economist; 7th United States National Security Advisor (b. 1916)
2004 – François Tavenas, Canadian engineer and academic (b. 1942)
  2004   – Zelimkhan Yandarbiyev, Chechen politician, 2nd President of the Chechen Republic of Ichkeria (b. 1952)
2005 – Nelson Briles, American baseball player and sportscaster (b. 1943)
  2005   – Lúcia Santos, Portuguese nun (b. 1907)
2006 – P. F. Strawson, English philosopher and author (b. 1919)
2007 – Elizabeth Jolley, English-Australian author and academic (b. 1923)
  2007   – Charlie Norwood, American captain and politician (b. 1941)
  2007   – Richard Gordon Wakeford, English air marshal (b. 1922)
2008 – Kon Ichikawa, Japanese director, producer, and screenwriter (b. 1915)
2009 – Edward Upward, English author and educator (b. 1903)
2010 – Lucille Clifton, American poet and academic (b. 1936)
  2010   – Dale Hawkins, American singer-songwriter and guitarist (b. 1936)
2012 – Russell Arms, American actor and singer (b. 1920)
  2012   – Louise Cochrane, American-English screenwriter and producer (b. 1918)
  2012   – Daniel C. Gerould, American playwright and academic (b. 1928)
2013 – Gerry Day, American journalist and screenwriter (b. 1922)
  2013   – Miles J. Jones, American pathologist and physician (b. 1952)
  2013   – Pieter Kooijmans, Dutch judge and politician, Minister of Foreign Affairs for The Netherlands (b. 1933)
  2013   – Andrée Malebranche, Haitian artist (b. 1916)
  2013   – Yuko Tojo, Japanese activist and politician (b. 1939)
2014 – Balu Mahendra, Sri Lankan-Indian director, cinematographer, and screenwriter (b. 1939)
  2014   – Richard Møller Nielsen, Danish footballer and manager (b. 1937)
  2014   – Ralph Waite, American actor and activist (b. 1928)
2015 – Faith Bandler, Australian activist and author (b. 1918)
  2015   – Stan Chambers, American journalist and actor (b. 1923)
2016 – O. N. V. Kurup, Indian poet and academic (b. 1931)
  2016   – Antonin Scalia, American lawyer and judge, Associate Justice of the Supreme Court of the United States (b. 1936)
2017 – Ricardo Arias Calderón, Panamanian politician (b. 1933)
  2017   – Aileen Hernandez, American union organizer and activist (b. 1926)
  2017   – Seijun Suzuki, Japanese filmmaker (b. 1923)
  2017   – Kim Jong-nam, North Korean politician (b. 1971)
  2017   – E-Dubble, American rapper (b. 1982)
2018 – Henrik, Prince Consort of Denmark, French-born Danish royal (b. 1934)
2019 – Callistus Ndlovu, Zimbabwean academic and politician (b. 1936)
2021 – Kadir Topbaş, Turkish politician (b. 1945)

Holidays and observances
Children's Day (Myanmar)
Christian feast day:
Absalom Jones (Episcopal Church (USA))
Beatrice of Ornacieux
Castor of Karden 
Catherine of Ricci
Dyfnog
Ermenilda of Ely
Fulcran
Jordan of Saxony
Polyeuctus (Roman Catholic Church)
February 13 (Eastern Orthodox liturgics)
World Radio Day

References

External links

 BBC: On This Day
 
 Historical Events on February 13

Days of the year
February